Vesyoly Mys is a rural locality (a settlement) in Verkh-Invenskoye Rural Settlement, Kudymkarsky District, Perm Krai, Russia. The population was 247 as of 2010. There are 10 streets.

Geography 
Vesyoly Mys is located 53 km west of Kudymkar (the district's administrative centre) by road. Yeremushkina is the nearest rural locality.

References 

Rural localities in Kudymkarsky District